We Thieves Are Honourable (Spanish: Los Ladrones Somos Gente Honrada) is a 1956 Spanish comedy film directed by Pedro Luis Ramirez and starring José Luis Ozores, José Isbert and Encarna Fuentes. The film was based on the 1941 play of the same title by Enrique Jardiel Poncela which had previously been adapted into a 1942 film.

Plot 
Arévalo's wealthy family is going to celebrate a party at his house. This event reaches the ears of a gang of thieves who are going to take advantage of the occasion to prepare a good hit. Everything has been carefully planned and nothing can go wrong. But something unexpected happens: The gang leader falls in love with the daughter of the owners of the house and the robbery becomes extremely complicated.

Cast
 José Luis Ozores as El Castelar  
 José Isbert as El Tío del Gabán  
 Encarna Fuentes as Herminia 
 Rafael Bardem as Don Felipe Arévalo  
 Julia Caba Alba as Eulalia  
 Carlos Miguel Solá as Daniel 'El Melancólico'  
 José Manuel Martín as Antón, el mayordomo  
 José Ramón Giner as Dr. Ramiro Laredo  
 Isabel Pallarés as Teresa, la nueva ama de llaves 
 Antonio Ozores as Menéndez  
 Nora Samsó as Doña Andrea  
 Pilar Gómez Ferrer as Monchi, la esposa del Dr. Laredo  
 Joaquín Roa as Vigilante  
 María Isbert as Berta  
 Emilio Santiago as El Titi  
 Juana Ginzo as Criada del Rastro  
 Julio Goróstegui
 Manuel Aguilera as Benito Ortega  
 Jacinto San Emeterio as Empleado de la joyería  
 Juan Cazalilla as Otro empleado  
 Ángel Álvarez as Farmacéutico  
 Milagros Leal as Mujer de Benito 
 Alicia Palacios  as Germana, la hermana de Don Felipe  
 Antonio Garisa as El Pelirrojo 
 José María Rodríguez as Sacristán  
 Antonio Molino Rojo as Invitado de la fiesta

References

Bibliography 
 Bentley, Bernard. A Companion to Spanish Cinema. Boydell & Brewer, 2008.

External links
 

1956 films
1956 comedy films
Spanish comedy films
1950s Spanish-language films
Spanish films based on plays
Films directed by Pedro Luis Ramírez
Remakes of Spanish films
1950s Spanish films
Spanish black-and-white films